Riebeek-Kasteel is one of the oldest towns in South Africa, situated at 80 km north-east of Cape Town in The Riebeek Valley together with its sister town Riebeek West. They set off in the direction of Paardeberg and on 3 February 1661 they ascended a lonely mountain and came upon the fertile vista of the Riebeek Valley. They named it Riebeek Kasteel, in honor of the Commander. 

Jan Smuts was born in Bovenplaatz, near Riebeek West, on May 24, 1870. Daniel Malan was born in 1874 in Riebeeck West. Both men later became prime ministers of South Africa.

Subsequently farmers established themselves in the valley and during 1900 the town was laid out in and around its existing church and its neighbor The Royal Hotel, the oldest hotel of South Africa. The town eventually developed and today it houses more or less 2700 residents including some of South Africa's most famous painters, attracted by the picturesque surroundings of the valley.

The town also serves as a satellite, a residential settlement for Paarl, Malmesbury and even the Metropole area. Often Riebeek Kasteel is referred as "the best kept secret of the Western Cape." and "Franschhoek 15 years ago."

In 2009 Riebeek Kasteel was chosen one of the three most beautiful towns of the Western Cape by the newspaper "Rapport". The other two finalists were Stellenbosch and Clanwilliam.

Sources
 Swartland Municipality
 Riebeek Valley Handbook

References

External links
  Riebeek Valley Tourism - Link to the website of the Riebeek Valley Tourism
 Oukloof forced removals in the Western Cape of South Africa – A community web site documenting the known history of the forced removal of the residents of Oukloof in the 1960s

Populated places in the Swartland Local Municipality